The Hit is a thriller novel written by American author David Baldacci. This is the second installment to feature Will Robie, a highly skilled U.S. Government assassin who first appeared in Baldacci's 2012 novel The Innocent. The book was initially published on April 23, 2013 by Grand Central Publishing.

References

External links
Official website

2013 American novels
Novels by David Baldacci
Grand Central Publishing books